This article displays the qualifying draw of the 2011 International German Open.

Players

Seeds

Qualifiers

Qualifying draw

First qualifier

Second qualifier

Third qualifier

Fourth qualifier

Fifth qualifier

Sixth qualifier

References
 Qualifying Draw

International German Open - qualifying
2011 International German Open
Qualification for tennis tournaments